Sala Regia is the Italian translation of Regal Room or Hall.

There are a number of such rooms in Italy. Among the best known are:
Sala Regia (Vatican)
Sala Regia of Palazzo del Quirinale